Garni, is a major village in the Kotayk Province of Armenia. It is known for the nearby classical temple. As of the 2011 census, the population of the village is 6,910.

History 
The settlement has an ancient history, and is best known for the Hellenistic Garni temple.  The area was first occupied in the 3rd millennium BC along easily defensible terrain at one of the bends of the Azat River.  In the 8th century BC the area was conquered by the Urartian King Argishti I.  The fortification at Garni was erected probably sometime in the 3rd century BC as a summer residence for the Armenian Orontid and Artaxiad royal dynasties. Later around the 1st century AD the fortress of Garni became the last refuge of King Mithridates of Armenia and where he and his family were assassinated by his son-in-law and nephew Rhadamistus.  The fortress was eventually sacked in 1386 by Timur Lenk. In 1679 an earthquake devastated the area destroying the temple.

Monuments and landmarks 
Garni is notable for its fortress complex with the 1st-century AD Garni Temple, Surb Astvatsatsin Church, Mashtots Hayrapet Church, a ruined 4th-century single-aisle church, a ruined Tukh Manuk Shrine, Saint Sargis Shrine, and a Queen Katranide Shrine.

Nearby is the Garni Gorge with well preserved basalt columns, carved out by the Goght River. This portion of the gorge is typically referred to as the "Symphony of the Stones". It is most easily reached via a road that leads left down the gorge just before reaching the temple of Garni. Another road leads to the gorge through the village, down a cobblestone road, and into the valley.

Once in the valley, turning right will lead to Garni Gorge, an 11th-century medieval bridge,  and the "Symphony of the Stones". Taking a left will lead along the river past a fish hatchery, up to the Khosrov State Reserve, and a little further Havuts Tar Monastery (which may be seen from the temple). The medieval bridge was controversially restored in 2013, in a project organized and paid for by the US government through its Ambassadors Fund for Cultural Preservation. Critics said the work destroyed the bridge's value as an historical monument.  Within the Khosrov reserve is Aghjots Vank from the 13th century, the church of Saint Stepanos, and the fortress of Kakavaberd.  Garni lies along the road to the UNESCO World Heritage Site of Geghard Monastery (a further 7 km southeast).

Gallery

See also 
Kotayk Province

References

External links 

 Armeniapedia.org: Garni Village
 Garni temple
 Old Khachkars (Cross-stones), Garni: photo1, photo2, photo3, photo4, photo5

Populated places in Kotayk Province
Tourist attractions in Kotayk Province
Erivan Governorate